Depalpur Tehsil , is an administrative subdivision (tehsil) of Okara District in the Punjab province of Pakistan, headquartered at the city of Depalpur.

Famous Families
 
Syed Bukhari (imam shah darbar tomb in shahi mosque complex), Syed Gillani (Sakhi Sedan Darbar tomb), Khichi, watto ,Arain,rao ,Dogar,khokhar,Dewan,chachar

Administration
The tehsil is administratively subdivided into the following 55 Union Councils, three of which form the tehsil capital:
Pul Dhool uc 126,
Awan Kalan,
Basirpur City 112,
Basirpur City 113,
Bawa Bareet,
Behlol Pur,
Bhella Ghulab Singh,
Bhoman Shah,
Bhon Munzabta,
Amli Moti,
Bonga Salah,
Chipli Pur,
Depalpur City 104,
Depalpur City 105,
Depalpur City D-103,
Dhuliania,
Farid Pur Sohag,
Guddar Malkana,
Hujra Shah Muqeem 109,
Hujra Shah Muqeem 110,
Hujra Shah Muqeem 111,
Haveli lakha City 106,
Haveli lakha City 107,
Haveli lakha City 108,
Jaith Pur,kari wala jageer 
Juj Khurad D-88,
Kalair Kalan,
Kani Pur,
M. Nagar,
Mancharian,
Mandi Ahmed Abad,
Maroof,
Mazhar Abad,
Meher Shah Khaga,
Mohant Darshan,
Mohib Ali Uttar,
Mustafabad,
Nama Jindaka,
Nehal Mahaar,
Pandat Munfool Pur,
Phullan Tolli,
Mouza Bhookan,
Abadi chowk Bhookan,
Pipli Pahar,
Qadir Abad,
Qila Jivind Singh,
Qila Tara Singh,
Rajowal,
Ratta Khunna,
Rehmat Wala,
Rohella Tejaka,
Rukin Pura,
Shah Nawaz Khan Wala,
Shah Yaka,
Sher Garh,
Soba Ram,
Wasaway Wala.

References

Tehsils of Punjab, Pakistan
Okara District